The 1963 All-SEC football team consists of American football players selected to the All-Southeastern Conference (SEC) chosen by various selectors for the 1963 NCAA University Division football season.

All-SEC selections

Ends
Billy Martin, Georgia Tech (AP-1, UPI-1)
Allen Brown, Ole Miss (AP-1, UPI-2)
Billy Truax, LSU (AP-2, UPI-1)
Howard Simpson, Auburn (AP-2, UPI-2)
Tommy Inman, Miss. St. (UPI-3)
Ted Davis, Georgia Tech (UPI-3)

Tackles
Whaley Hall, Ole Miss (AP-1, UPI-1)
Tommy Neville, Miss. St. (AP-1, UPI-2)
Herschel Turner, Kentucky (UPI-1)
Ray Rissmiller, Georgia (AP-2, UPI-2)
Dennis Murphy, Florida (AP-2, UPI-3)
Mike Calamari, Tulane (UPI-3)

Guards
Steve DeLong, Tennessee (AP-1, UPI-1)
Robbie Huckelbridge, LSU (AP-1, UPI-2)
Stan Hindman, Ole Miss (AP-2, UPI-1)
Bill Van Dyke, Auburn (UPI-2)
Jack Katz, Florida (UPI-3)
Remi Prudhomme, LSU (UPI-3)

Centers
Ken Dill, Ole Miss (AP-1, UPI-2)
Pat Watson, Miss. St. (AP-2 [as G], UPI-1)
Dave Simmons, Georgia Tech (AP-2)
Ruffin Rodrigue, LSU (UPI-3)

Quarterbacks
Billy Lothridge, Georgia Tech (AP-1, UPI-1)
Larry Rakestraw, Georgia (AP-2, UPI-2)
Perry Lee Dunn, Ole Miss (AP-2, UPI-2)
Joe Namath, Alabama (UPI-2)

Halfbacks
Jimmy Sidle, Auburn (AP-1, UPI-1)
Benny Nelson, Alabama (AP-1, UPI-1)
Ode Burrell, Miss. St. (AP-2, UPI-2)
Tucker Frederickson, Auburn (College Football Hall of Fame) (AP-2, UPI-3)
Danny Leblanc, LSU (UPI-3)
Sonny Fisher, Miss. St. (UPI-3)

Fullbacks
Larry Dupree, Florida (AP-1, UPI-1)
Hoyle Granger, Miss. St. (UPI-3)

Key

AP = Associated Press

UPI = United Press International

Bold = Consensus first-team selection by both AP and UPI

See also
1963 College Football All-America Team

References

All-SEC
All-SEC football teams